Shaun Bradbury (born 11 February 1974) is an English former footballer who played as a striker in the Football League for Wolverhampton Wanderers.

Career
Bradbury joined Wolverhampton Wanderers in 1990 as an apprentice, before signing professional forms in July 1992. He made his senior debut on 8 October 1991 in a League Cup tie at Shrewsbury, but did not feature again until the end of the 1992–93 season, when he scored twice on his league debut in a 3–1 win against Millwall on 1 May 1993. He started the following match, away at Derby, but never played another first team game for Wolves.

In July 1994 he moved to Third Division side Hereford United, but did not make a first team appearance for them before dropping into non-league football, initially with Shifnal Town. His later career included a six-year spell with Chasetown.

References

1974 births
Living people
Footballers from Birmingham, West Midlands
English footballers
Association football forwards
Wolverhampton Wanderers F.C. players
Hereford United F.C. players
Telford United F.C. players
Chasetown F.C. players
Bridgnorth Town F.C. players
English Football League players
National League (English football) players